The UC Davis Aggies Women's Basketball team represents the University of California, Davis in Davis, California, United States. The school's team currently competes in the Big West Conference.

History
Following a successful stint in an NCAA Division II program, the UC Davis women's basketball team began its transition to the NCAA Division I level in 2003–04, officially competing as a member of the Big West Conference in 2007–08.

Entering the 2020–21 season, the Aggies have won five Big West Conference regular season titles (2009–10, 2016–17, 2017–18, 2018–19, 2019–20) and a pair of Big West Tournament titles (2011, 2019) in their combined 13 Division I seasons. UC Davis is one of three schools in league history to win at least four consecutive Big West regular season titles, joining UC Santa Barbara (1996–2005) and Long Beach State (1985–1989).

The Aggies have twice advanced to the NCAA Tournament (2011, 2019) as the automatic qualifier out of the Big West Conference and have earned five berths to the WNIT, including an "Elite Eight" appearance in 2018 and a "Sweet 16" appearance in 2017.

, UC Davis has posted a 248–160 (.608) overall record as a Division I program including a 135–69 (.662) record in Big West Conference play.

National affiliations
AIAW Division III: 1971–72 to 1980–81 
NCAA Division II: 1981–82 to 2002–03
NCAA Division I: 2003–04 to present (provisional from 2003 to 2007)

Conference affiliations
Golden State Conference: 1977–78 to 1981–82
Northern California Athletic Conference: 1982–83 to 1997–98
California Collegiate Athletic Association: 1998–99 to 2003–04
Independent: 2004–05 to 2006–07
Big West Conference: 2007–08 to present

Season records

Coaches

All coaching records as of the 2019–20 season.

Head coach Pam Gill–Fisher was a student-athlete (basketball, softball, volleyball, tennis, and field hockey), coach, and administrator, at UC Davis. She was inducted into the Cal Aggie Athletics Hall of Fame twice, once as a student-athlete in 1984 and once as a coach and administrator in 2012. She led UC Davis women's basketball to a total of 164 wins over 12 seasons, earning Northern California Athletic Conference Coach of the Year honors in 1986. She also served as head coach for the Aggies' women's volleyball and tennis teams, including an NCAA Division II national title in tennis in 1990.

Jorja Hoehn ranks second in wins with 205 victories in nine seasons, won the WBCA 1995 Division II National Coach of the Year, and Northern California Athletic Conference Coach of the Year in 1995 and 1996. The Aggies reached the NCAA Division II West Regional Final six times and reached the NCAA Tournament in eight of her nine campaigns. She was inducted into the Cal Aggie Athletics Hall of Fame in 2005.

Sandy Simpson coached the team for 14 seasons and holds the school record for coaching victories with 251. He played for the Aggie men's team and was an assistant for the women's program before becoming the interim head coach for the 1996–97 where he was named the Northern California Athletic Conference Coach of the Year in 1997. He was the interim coach again in 1998–99, earning the California Collegiate Athletic Association Coach of the Year, and was named the permanent head coach in 1999. He was the coach during the transition to Division I and earned the Big West Conference Coach of the Year in 2008 and 2010. In 2008, he led UC Davis to a second-place finish in the standings and advanced to the Big West Tournament championship game, becoming only the second team in league history to reach the championship game and earn a postseason berth in its first year in the conference. In his final season, led fourth-seeded UC Davis to the Big West Tournament Championship over top-seeded Cal Poly in 2011 and the program's first berth in the NCAA Division I women's basketball tournament

Jennifer Gross served as an assistant and associate head coach under Sandy Simpson from 2004 until he retired in 2011. She has since won the Big West Conference Coach of the Year in four consecutive seasons from 2017 to 2020 and was a finalist for the WBCA 2018 National Coach of the Year Award. She was inducted into the Cal Aggie Athletics Hall of Fame in 2003 as a student-athlete for her four seasons with the Aggies from 1993 to 1997, setting school records for career assists (448), steals (300), and three-pointers made (163).

Postseason

NCAA Division I tournament results
UC Davis has advanced to the NCAA Division I women's basketball tournament three times, all as an automatic qualifier from the Big West Conference. The Aggies are 0–3 in NCAA Tournament play.

Women's National Invitation Tournament results
UC Davis has made five appearances in the Women's National Invitation Tournament (WNIT). The Aggies are 5–5 all-time in the WNIT, including an "Elite Eight" appearance in 2018 and a "Sweet 16" appearance in 2017. The wins over Utah and Colorado State in 2017 were the program's first postseason wins as a Division I program. The five WNIT victories overall are the most of any Big West Conference school as of 2019–20, while the "Elite Eight" berth in 2018 marked the furthest that any Big West Conference school had advanced in that tournament under its current format that began in 1998.

NCAA Division II Tournament results
UC Davis made 12 appearances in the NCAA Division II women's basketball tournament with a 12–12 record. The Aggies advanced to the "Elite Eight" of the 1997 NCAA Division II Tournament, reaching the semifinals before falling to Southern Indiana, 70–62, and finishing third nationally with a 76–61 win over Bentley in the third-place game.

AIAW Division III tournament results
The Aggies made one appearance in the AIAW National Division III basketball tournament, with a combined record of 0–1.

References

External links